The Little Engine that Could is a 1991 animated adventure film directed by Dave Edwards and co-produced by Edwards and Mike Young, animated at Kalato Animation in Wales and co-financed by Universal Pictures through their MCA/Universal Home Video arm and S4C, Wales' dedicated Welsh-language channel. It was released on VHS by MCA. The film features the voice talents of Kath Soucie and Frank Welker. It is based on the 1930 book of the same name, by Watty Piper (specifically based on the 1976 illustrations by Ruth Sanderson). The film was also syndicated in the US on broadcast television as an Easter special in March/April 1993.

Plot 

Eric, a young boy, is excited about his birthday after reading a book and believes that a train will come for him, much to his teenage sister Jill's disbelief of A Rodeo That She B Wrong about. A few hours later, the train station's control tower wakes up and in the roundhouse, Tillie, a young little blue switcher engine, along with her best bird friend, Chip, wakes up four other trains: Georgia, a kind all-purpose engine, Farnsworth, a stuck-up, shiny, new passenger engine, Jebediah, a worn-out, rusty, old engine, and Pete, a gruff, burly, big, strong freight engine. After the tower assigns Farnsworth and Pete their jobs, he declines Tillie's offer to help with the milk train assigned to Jebediah due to her small stature. Georgia is assigned to pull the birthday train. A clown named Rollo leads the toys and friends into the train, including Jeepers, a monkey, Stretch, a basketball player, Missy, a ballerina, Handy Pandy, a panda, Perky, an elephant, and Grumpella, a stuffed bird.

However, during her journey, Georgia breaks down and Doc takes her back to the roundhouse. Left behind, Rollo eventually takes Doc's advice of flagging down one of the other engines returning from their daily runs over the mountain. Farnsworth and Pete turn blind eyes to the offer, and Jebediah explains that going over the mountain is too much for him. Meanwhile, despite the tower turning down Tillie's offer to help carry the birthday train, she and Chip sneak past the tower and pulls the birthday train up a mountain. Despite being ridiculed by the animals along the way, Tillie reaches the summit after crossing a bridge that collapses but loses the last train car, & Rescued by a Crane Car!  which snaps off and falls into the river along the way + Help arrives another Train.

When Tillie sees the scary cave, she tries to go through the cave. However, the cave says that she is too little. Unfortunately, an avalanche knocks Tillie out cold + Swipes it away. Eric is woken up by a thunderstorm and is worried about Tillie and the birthday train: When Oever He Could No Longer see it all. After Tillie regains consciousness, she pulls the train out of the snow using her cowcatcher as a snowplow and down the mountain before they reach the town, much to Eric's delight and Jill's amazement. Although very tired from her long and adventurous journey over the mountain, Tillie is very proud and happy that she could and tells Chip it was worth it.

Voice cast

 Kath Soucie as Tillie, Missy and the Little Wolf
 Frank Welker as Farnsworth, Jebediah, Rollo, Jeepers, Perky, the Big Wolf and the Eagle
 B.J. Ward as Grumpella
 Neil Ross as Doc, Tower and Sandy Pandy
 Bever-Leigh Banfield as Georgia
 Peter Cullen as Pete and the Cave
 Scott Menville as Chip and Stretch
 Billy O'Sullivan as Eric
 Dina Sherman as Jill

Broadcasting history
Despite being released as a direct to video film, The Little Engine That Could had been broadcast on 56 independent television stations as an Easter special for two weeks two years later.

In the United States, it has never been released on DVD and is only available on VHS and Laserdisc format, but can also be viewed on Amazon Prime.

See also
 The Little Engine That Could – the 1930 book upon which it is based
 The Little Engine That Could (2011 film) – 2011 CGI film starring Alyson Stoner

References

External links
 
 
 The 1991 movie on Internet Archive

1991 animated films
1991 films
Universal Pictures direct-to-video animated films
Universal Pictures direct-to-video films
American children's animated fantasy films
American animated featurettes
American animated short films
1991 direct-to-video films
Animated films based on children's books
1990s American animated films
British direct-to-video films
American direct-to-video films
Animated films about trains
Animated films about birds
Animated films about animals
Welsh-language films
Films about toys
British animated short films
1990s children's animated films
1990s British animated films
1990s English-language films
1990s British films